The Subprefecture of Santana-Tucuruvi is one of 32 subprefectures of the city of São Paulo, Brazil.  It comprises three districts: Santana, Tucuruvi, and Mandaqui.

References

Subprefectures of São Paulo